James Madison High School (JMHS) is a public high school in Vienna, Virginia, United States. It is part of the Fairfax County Public Schools district. According to Newsweek Magazine's 2014 list of the top US high schools, Madison was ranked 93. U.S. News & World Report named it a Silver Medal school in 2010. The school has a 98% graduation rate.

Demographics 
In the 2020–2021 school year, James Madison High School's student body was 62.71% White, 14.73% Asian, 12.60% Hispanic, 1.86% Black and 8.11% Other.

Standardized testing 
James Madison High School continually surpasses most Virginia schools in statewide and nationwide exams.  For the 2006–2007 academic year, Madison's average score on the Virginia Standards of Learning (SOL) was 95%.  In 2015, Madison's average SAT score of 1744 far exceeded the state (1533) and national (1467) averages; the school's average ACT score of 26.6 likewise outperformed state (23.1) and national (21.0) figures.

Athletics 
James Madison's sports teams play in the Concorde District and 6A Northern Region. Their traditional rival schools include nearby schools Oakton, Langley, Marshall, Chantilly, and South Lakes.

Crew 
Founded in 2002, the James Madison Rowing team rows out of Sandy Run Regional Park, which is set on the banks of the Occoquan River. Both the men's and women's teams have had a fair amount of success. The women's team holds multiple state championships and went so far as to win the Stotesbury Cup and SRAA National Championship (1V8) in 2013.

Marching Band and Concert Band
The James Madison High School "Pride of Vienna" Marching Band has won three consecutive Virginia state championships in 2018, 2019 and 2021 as well as the Bands of America mid-Atlantic regional in 2019. They also attended the 2019 Bands of America Grand National Championships, where they achieved second place in class 3A, placing them at 29th overall in the semifinals.
The school is one of the five schools to have earned the Sudler Flag twice. In the 2022 VBODA (Virginia Band & Orchestra Association) assessment, the school's symphonic band achieved perfect grades for grade 4, with its wind symphony achieving the same in grade 6, making it the highest achieving band in the district.

Newspaper 
Madison's resident newspaper is The Hawk Talk, run by students and advised by Lauren Arvis. Their Editor-in-Chiefs for the 2022-23 school year are Connor Foote, Cate Langhorn, Aidan Rundell, and Mallory Vaudo.

Notable alumni 
 Randy Scott, ESPN sportscaster
 Natalie Wynn a.k.a. ContraPoints, YouTuber
 Jay Franklin, former MLB player
 Azita Ghanizada, actress
 Jim McNamara, former MLB player
 Mike Wallace, former MLB player
 Mia Yim, professional wrestler
 Adam Bhala Lough, filmmaker
 Robb Spewak, radio personality
 John Brenkus, host of ESPN's Sports Science and the podcast "The Brink of Midnight”
 Mark Jordan Legan, TV writer, NPR contributor, podcast "Film Freaks Forever"
 Stephen Swartz, musician
 James Triantos, Top 30 Chicago Cubs Prospect 
 Bob Brower, former MLB player

References 

High schools in Fairfax County, Virginia
Vienna, Virginia
Public high schools in Virginia
Educational institutions established in 1959
1959 establishments in Virginia